Plaumann & Co v Commission (1963) Case 25/62 is an EU law case, concerning judicial review in the European Union.

Facts
Plaumann & Co imported clementines. The German authorities wished to suspend custom duties on imports, but the European Commission refused permission. Mr Plaumann sought judicial review of the Commission decision.

Judgment
The Court of Justice held that Plaumann & Co had no standing for judicial review of the Commission decision because the firm was not "individually concerned".

See also
European Union law

Notes

References

Court of Justice of the European Union case law